Soleymaniyeh (also Romanized as Soleymānīyeh) is a village in Dorudfaraman Rural District, in the Central District of Kermanshah County, Kermanshah Province, Iran. At the 2016 census, its population was 921, in 268 families.

References 

Populated places in Kermanshah County